Juris Laipenieks (born 9 April 1940) is a Chilean athlete. He competed in the men's decathlon at the 1960 Summer Olympics.

References

1940 births
Living people
Athletes (track and field) at the 1959 Pan American Games
Athletes (track and field) at the 1960 Summer Olympics
Chilean decathletes
Olympic athletes of Chile
Athletes from Riga
Latvian emigrants to Chile
Pan American Games competitors for Chile